Evolving classification functions (ECF), evolving classifier functions or evolving classifiers are used for classifying and clustering in the field of machine learning and artificial intelligence, typically employed for data stream mining tasks in dynamic and changing environments.

See also
Supervised Classification on Data Streams 
Evolving fuzzy rule-based Classifier (eClass )
Evolving Takagi-Sugeno fuzzy systems (eTS )
Evolving All-Pairs (ensembled) classifiers (EFC-AP )
Evolving Connectionist Systems (ECOS)
Dynamic Evolving Neuro-Fuzzy Inference Systems (DENFIS)
Evolving Fuzzy Neural Networks (EFuNN)
Evolving Self-Organising Maps
neuro-fuzzy techniques
hybrid intelligent systems
fuzzy clustering
Growing Neural Gas

References

Classification algorithms